The Polynesia Cup 1994 was the first Polynesia-wide tournament ever held. It took place in Western Samoa (later known as Samoa) and four teams participated: Tahiti, Western Samoa, American Samoa and Tonga and served for the first time as Oceania Nations Cup qualifier.

The teams played each other according to a round-robin format with Tahiti winning the tournament for the first time and qualifying to the 1996 OFC Nations Cup.

Results

Tahiti qualified for Oceania Nations Cup 1996

References

Polynesia Cup
Wan
1994
1996 OFC Nations Cup
1994 in Samoan sport